Irati Urruzola Bermúdez (born 3 January 2000) is a Spanish footballer who plays as a defender for Alavés.

Club career
Urru started her career at Añorga.

References

External links
Profile at La Liga
 

2000 births
Living people
Women's association football defenders
Spanish women's footballers
People from Lasarte-Oria
Sportspeople from Gipuzkoa
Footballers from the Basque Country (autonomous community)
Añorga KKE players
Deportivo Alavés Gloriosas players
Primera División (women) players
Segunda Federación (women) players
Athletic Club Femenino B players
CA Osasuna Femenino players
Primera Federación (women) players